Trupanea chrysanthemifolii is a species of tephritid or fruit flies in the genus Trupanea of the family Tephritidae.

Distribution
Chile.

References

Tephritinae
Insects described in 1985
Diptera of South America
Endemic fauna of Chile